The Czechoslovak 2. liga was the second level of ice hockey in Czechoslovakia from 1953-1969.

History
The league was created as the Celostátní soutěž (which it was known as until 1956) in 1953. For the first season, it was divided into Groups A-D, with the top team from each group meeting for the final. For 1954-55, Groups E and F were added, and the top team from each group again met for the final. From 1955-1963, the league was divided into Groups A and B, and no final was held. For the 1963-64 season, the league expanded to four groups, with Group D consisting solely of Slovak teams. 

After the 1968-69 season, the league was replaced by the 1. česká národní hokejová liga for Czech teams, and the 1. slovenská národná hokejová liga for Slovak teams.

External links
 History of Czechoslovak hockey
 League results

2
Sports leagues established in 1953
1953 establishments in Czechoslovakia
1969 disestablishments in Czechoslovakia
Defunct second tier ice hockey leagues in Europe